Lucy Walker is an English film director. She has directed the documentaries Devil's Playground (2002), Blindsight (2006), Waste Land (2010), Countdown to Zero (2010), and The Crash Reel (2013). She has also directed the short films The Tsunami and the Cherry Blossom (2011) and The Lion's Mouth Opens (2014).

Film career
Walker's 2014 documentary The Lion's Mouth Opens focuses on filmmaker-actor Marianna Palka's attempt to discover if she has inherited Huntington's disease, the incurable degenerative disorder that took Palka's father. Nick Higgins worked with Walker as cinematographer for the documentary. Walker premiered The Lion's Mouth Opens at Sundance on 26 January 2014.

Walker was inspired to make the 2013 documentary The Crash Reel when she met Kevin Pearce (snowboarder) at a retreat organized by David Mayer de Rothschild. The Crash Reel premiered at Sundance on 19 January 2013 as the Opening Night Gala film. The film chronicles the rivalry between Kevin and Shaun White, which culminates in Kevin's life-changing crash. Outside featured Lucy in a cover story, "Lucy Walker Will Change Winter Sports".

Walker's 2011 documentary The Tsunami and the Cherry Blossom focuses on the 2011 Tōhoku earthquake and tsunami and its survivors' struggle to survive. The film premiered at the Toronto International Film Festival in 2011, and it went on to screen at festivals, including Sundance, in 2012.

Waste Land focuses on Brazilian artist Vik Muniz and a group of catadores—pickers of recyclable materials—who transform recyclable materials from the world's largest dump in Rio de Janeiro into contemporary art sold at the most prestigious auction house in London. Waste Land premiered at Sundance in 2010. Waste Land was released theatrically in the US by Arthouse Films, in Canada, in the UK by E1 Entertainment, and in Australia/NZ by Hopscotch Films.

Blindsight premiered at Toronto. It follows the journey of six blind Tibetan teenagers who climb up the north side of Mount Everest with blind American mountaineer Erik Weihenmayer and their teacher, Sabriye Tenberken, who founded the only school for the blind in Tibet, Braille Without Borders. Both Waste Land and Blindsight won the Audience Award at Berlin Film Festival.

Devil's Playground, Walker's first feature documentary, examined the struggles of Amish teenagers during their period of experimentation (rumspringa). It premiered at the 2002 Sundance Film Festival.

Countdown to Zero, an exposé of the present-day threat of nuclear proliferation, also premiered at Sundance 2010. It also played in the Official Selection at Cannes Film Festival, before being released in the US by Magnolia Pictures, in the UK by Dogwoof, and in Japan by Paramount.

Walker's credits in television include directing over a dozen episodes of Nickelodeon's Blue's Clues, her first job out of film school, for which she was twice nominated for Emmy Awards for Outstanding Directing. Her content and commercial work includes directing "Project Daniel" for Intel, which was awarded an AICP Curator's Award and three Bronze Lions at the Cannes Festival of Creativity

Walker was named one of the "Top 25 New Faces in Independent Film" by Filmmaker and called "the new Errol Morris" by The Hollywood Reporter. Variety has profiled her as a notable "Femme Filmmaker", praising her ability to connect with audiences.

Bring Your Own Brigade which follows the aftermath of the Camp Fire (2018) had its world premiere at the Sundance Film Festival on 29 January 2021. Walker served as a producer on Why Did You Kill Me? directed by Fredrick Munk, which was released on 14 April 2021 by Netflix.

Filmography
Devil's Playground (2002)
Blindsight (2006)
Countdown to Zero (2010)
Waste Land (2010)
The Tsunami and the Cherry Blossom (2011)
The Crash Reel (2013)
The Lion's Mouth Opens (2014)
Buena Vista Social Club: Adios (2017)
Bring Your Own Brigade (2021)
Why Did You Kill Me? (2021) (producer)
How to Change Your Mind (2022)

Select accolades

References

External links

Personal website

Living people
British documentary film directors
English women film directors
Film directors from London
Tisch School of the Arts alumni
Year of birth missing (living people)
Women documentary filmmakers
Fulbright alumni